Hildólfr (Old Norse "war-wolf") is a son of Odin according to the Nafnaþulur list of the Prose Eddas Skáldskaparmál.

Modern influence 
A tank in Mobile Suit Gundam MS IGLOO is named Hildolfr after the figure.

Heroes in Norse myths and legends
Sons of Odin